The Tampere Tunnel (also the Rantaväylä Tunnel) is a 2,3 kilometre-long road tunnel in Tampere, Finland. It was opened 15 November 2016, six months before scheduled. The Tampere Tunnel is the longest road tunnel in Finland. It is part of Highway 12, which passes north of Tampere city center. 36,000 vehicles a day drive through the tunnel.

See also 
 Paasikiven–Kekkosentie

Sources 
Welcome to the Tunnel! Finnish Transport Agency.

References

External links 

Tunnels completed in 2016
Road tunnels
Road tunnels in Finland
Buildings and structures in Tampere
Transport in Tampere